Anametalia is a genus of echinoderms belonging to the family Brissidae.

The species of this genus are found in Australia.

Species:

Anametalia grandis 
Anametalia regularis 
Anametalia sternaloides

References

Brissidae
Echinoidea genera